The 1998 Toyota Princess Cup was a women's tennis tournament played on outdoor hard courts at the Ariake Coliseum in Tokyo, Japan that was part of Tier II of the 1998 WTA Tour. It was the second edition of the tournament and was held from 21 September through 27 September 1998. Second-seeded Monica Seles won the singles title and earned $79,000 first-prize money.

Finals

Singles

 Monica Seles defeated  Arantxa Sánchez Vicario 4–6, 6–3, 6–4
 It was Seles' 2nd singles title of the year and the 43rd of her career.

doubles

 Anna Kournikova /  Monica Seles defeated  Mary Joe Fernández /  Arantxa Sánchez Vicario 6–4, 6–4
 It was Kournikova's only title of the year and the 1st of her career. It was Seles' 3rd title of the year and the 49th of her career.

External links
 ITF tournament edition details
 Tournament draws

Toyota Princess Cup
Toyota Princess Cup
1998 in Japanese tennis
1998 in Japanese women's sport